Éder Luís de Oliveira (born 19 April 1985), known simply as Éder Luís, is a Brazilian professional footballer who plays as a winger.

Club career
On 29 December 2009, Éder Luís signed with Portuguese club Benfica for the second half of the 2009–10 season. Benfica purchased 50% of the player's rights for two million euros.

In June 2010, he was loaned to Vasco da Gama along with Fellipe Bastos until June 2012.

In June 2012, he signed with Vasco da Gama on a permanent basis.

In August 2013, he was loaned to Al-Nasr for two years. In March 2014, he suffered a severe injury to the meniscus of his right knee.

In May 2015, he was returned from loan to Vasco da Gama.

On December 29, 2017, he signed witch Red Bull Brasil.

Career statistics

Honours
Atlético Mineiro
Campeonato Brasileiro Série B: 2006
Campeonato Mineiro: 2007

São Paulo
Campeonato Brasileiro Série A: 2008

Benfica
Primeira Liga: 2009–10
Taça da Liga: 2009–10

Vasco da Gama
Copa do Brasil: 2011

References

External links
 
 
 
 CBF 
 Guardian Stats Centre

1985 births
Living people
Brazilian footballers
Brazilian expatriate footballers
Clube Atlético Mineiro players
São Paulo FC players
S.L. Benfica footballers
CR Vasco da Gama players
Al-Nasr SC (Dubai) players
Red Bull Brasil players
Ceará Sporting Club players
Esporte Clube São Bento players
Guarani FC players
Campeonato Brasileiro Série A players
Primeira Liga players
Expatriate footballers in Portugal
Expatriate footballers in the United Arab Emirates
People from Uberaba
UAE Pro League players
Association football wingers
Sportspeople from Minas Gerais